The Gabon forest robin (Stiphrornis erythrothorax gabonensis) is a subspecies of the forest robin found at low levels of forests in Cameroon, Gabon and Bioko. In 1999 it was recommended that it should be treated as a separate species instead of a subspecies. IUCN and some other authorities do not recognize the split, and consequently it has not been rated as species separate from the forest robin. However, it has been described as frequent to locally abundant, and is therefore unlikely to qualify for a threatened category.

References

Stiphrornis
Birds of the Gulf of Guinea
Birds of Central Africa